Lebedus or Lebedos was one of the twelve cities of the Ionian League, located south of Smyrna, Klazomenai and neighboring Teos and before Ephesus, which is further south. It was on the coast, ninety stadia (16.65 km) to the east of Cape Myonnesus, and 120 (22.2 km) west of Colophon.

The city was built on and around a very small peninsula (175 m long, reaching a height of 61 m and with an isthmus 201 m wide), which is called the Kısık Peninsula today and depends on the coastal township of Ürkmez, part of Seferihisar locality, a district center depending on the province seat of İzmir.

History
According to Pausanias, the town was inhabited by Carians when the Ionian Greeks immigrated there under the guidance of Andræmon, a son of Codrus. Strabo, however, states that it was colonized by Andropompus and that it previously bore the name of Artis in Lydia. Velleius Paterculus wrote that Greeks from Athens established the city as well as other cities in Ionia. 
Lebedos became a flourishing city thanks to its commerce, and was famous for its mineral springs, but it was one of the smaller cities of the Ionian League, handicapped by the limited space of its hinterland and a comparatively unsuitable port.

In the Hellenistic age, around 304 BC, Antigonus I Monophthalmus tried to join the city with Teos; however, this operation was incomplete and eventually annulled by Lysimachus, who moved its population to Ephesus in 292 BC. At some point, the name Ptolemais (Πτολεμαΐς) was bestowed on the town, probably by Ptolemy III Euergetes.

Under Roman rule, it flourished anew, becoming the meeting place of the actors of all Ionia when these were temporarily exiled from Teos, and festivals were celebrated in honour of Dionysus.

Its scanty remains are near the modern town of Seferihisar.

Ecclesiastical history
Lebedus was an episcopal see, suffragan of Ephesus until the 12th or 13th century. Three bishops are known: Cyriacus, who witnessed the Second Council of Ephesus in 449; Julian, represented by his metropolitan at the Council of Chalcedon in 451; Theophanes or Thomas, who attended the Second Council of Nicaea in 787.

Lebedus remains as a Roman Catholic titular see.

Sources

References 

Seferihisar District
Ionian League
Populated places in ancient Ionia
Former populated places in Turkey
Ancient Greek archaeological sites in Turkey
Geography of İzmir Province
History of İzmir Province
Catholic titular sees in Asia
Members of the Delian League
Greek city-states